Matthew Thomson (born May 28, 2000) is an American tennis player.

Thomson made his ATP main draw debut at the 2021 Winston-Salem Open after receiving a wildcard into the doubles main draw.

Thomson plays college tennis at Wake Forest University.

References

External links
 
 

2000 births
Living people
American male tennis players
Sportspeople from Winston-Salem, North Carolina
Wake Forest Demon Deacons men's tennis players